CKNC-TV was a television station in Sudbury, Ontario, Canada. The station was in operation from 1971 to 2002 as a private affiliate of CBC Television, and then continued until 2012 as a network-owned rebroadcaster of the network's Toronto affiliate CBLT.

History

CKNC was established on October 8, 1971 by J. Conrad Lavigne, the owner of CFCL in Timmins. On the same day, the existing television station in Sudbury, CKSO, switched its affiliation to CTV. A rebroadcaster with the call sign CKNC-TV-1 went to air in Elliot Lake on the same date. That transmitter was sold to the CBC in 1982, although it continued to air CKNC's signal for the remainder of the station's existence.

Until 1980, CICI and CKNC aggressively competed with each other for advertising dollars, leaving both in a precarious financial position due to the Sudbury market's relatively small size. In 1980, the Canadian Radio-television and Telecommunications Commission approved the merger of the two stations, along with their co-owned stations in North Bay and Timmins, into the MCTV twinstick.

In 1990, the MCTV stations were acquired by Baton Broadcasting, which became the sole corporate owner of CTV in 1997.

End of operations
CTV subsequently sold its four CBC affiliates in Northern Ontario, CKNC, CHNB in North Bay, CJIC in Sault Ste. Marie and CFCL in Timmins directly to the CBC in 2002. All four ceased to exist as separate stations on October 27, 2002, becoming rebroadcasters of Toronto's CBLT, with CKNC's call sign changed to CBLT-6. These translators would close on July 31, 2012, due to budget cuts affecting the CBC.

Transmitters

Other notes

CKNC was also the original callsign, in the 1920s and 1930s, of a radio station in Toronto that now uses the callsign CJBC. The CKNC currently belongs to a radio station in Simcoe, Ontario as CKNC-FM.

References

External links
CRTC Decision 2001-457-6, license renewal for all MCTV stations.
 

KNC
KNC
Television channels and stations established in 1971
Television channels and stations disestablished in 2002
1971 establishments in Ontario
2002 disestablishments in Ontario
KNC-TV